

1964
 The Holy Modal Rounders: The Holy Modal Rounders

1965
 The Holy Modal Rounders: The Holy Modal Rounders 2
June 1965 The Byrds Mr. Tambourine Man
December 1965 The Byrds Turn! Turn! Turn!

1966
May 1966 Rick Nelson Bright Lights & Country Music
May 1966 Bob Dylan Blonde on Blonde
July 1966 The Byrds Fifth Dimension
Dec 1966 Buffalo Springfield Buffalo Springfield

1967
The Holy Modal Rounders: Indian War Whoop
Feb 1967 Gene Clark: Gene Clark with the Gosdin Brothers
Feb 1967 The Byrds Younger Than Yesterday
Feb 1967 Jerry Reed The Unbelievable Guitar and Voice of Jerry Reed
April 1967 Rick Nelson: Country Fever
April 1967 The Nitty Gritty Dirt Band The Nitty Gritty Dirt Band
May 1967 Kenny Rogers and The First Edition: The First Edition
Nov 1967 Buffalo Springfield: Buffalo Springfield Again
Dec 1967 Bob Dylan: John Wesley Harding (recorded Oct-Nov 1967)

1968
The Holy Modal Rounders: The Moray Eels Eat The Holy Modal Rounders
The Dillards: Wheatstraw Suite
Jan 1968 The Everly Brothers: Roots
Jan 1968 The Byrds: The Notorious Byrd Brothers
July 1968 The International Submarine Band: Safe at Home (recorded July 1967)
July 1968 Buffalo Springfield: Last Time Around
July 1968 The Byrds: Sweetheart of the Rodeo (recorded Mar-May 1968)
July 1968 The Band: Music from Big Pink
July 1968 Creedence Clearwater Revival: Creedence Clearwater Revival (rec. Oct 1967-Feb 1968)
Oct 1968 Dillard & Clark: The Fantastic Expedition of Dillard & Clark
Oct 1968 The Beau Brummels: Bradley's Barn
Oct 1968 Brewer & Shipley: Down in L.A.
Nov 1968 Neil Young: Neil Young

1969
1969 Mason Proffit Wanted
1969 Brewer & Shipley: Weeds
Jan 1969 Creedence Clearwater Revival Bayou Country
Jan 1969 Moby Grape: Moby Grape '69
Jan 1969 Jerry Lee Lewis Another Place, Another Time
Feb 1969 The Flying Burrito Brothers: The Gilded Palace of Sin
Feb 1969 Ian Matthews: Matthews' Southern Comfort
Feb 1969 Buffalo Springfield: Retrospective: The Best of Buffalo Springfield
Mar 1969 The Byrds: Dr. Byrds & Mr. Hyde
Mar 1969 Linda Ronstadt: Hand Sown ... Home Grown
Apr 1969 Bob Dylan: Nashville Skyline
Apr 1969 Sir Douglas Quintet: Mendocino
May 1969 Elvis Presley: From Elvis in Memphis
May 1969 Neil Young: Everybody Knows This Is Nowhere
May 1969 Crosby, Stills & Nash: Crosby, Stills & Nash
May 1969 John Stewart: California Bloodlines
June 1969 Poco: Pickin' Up the Pieces
June 1969 Johnny Cash At San Quentin
July 1969 Area Code 615: Area Code 615
July 1969 Moby Grape: Truly Fine Citizen
July 1969 Delaney & Bonnie: The Original Delaney & Bonnie & Friends
Aug 1969 Creedence Clearwater Revival Green River
Aug 1969 Dillard & Clark: Through the Morning Through the Night
Sep 1969 The Band: The Band
Oct 1969 The Byrds: Ballad of Easy Rider
Nov 1969 Steve Young: Rock Salt & Nails
Nov 1969 Creedence Clearwater Revival Willy and the Poor Boys

1970
1970 The Dillards: Copperfields
1970 Rick Nelson: In Concert at the Troubadour, 1969 (rec. Dec. 1969)
1970 Rick Nelson: Rick Sings Nelson
1970 Swampwater: Swampwater (One Way Records)
Jan 1970 John Phillips: John Phillips (John, the Wolf King of L.A.)
Jan 1970 Brewer & Shipley: Tarkio
Feb 1970 Phil Ochs Greatest Hits
Feb 1970 Nitty Gritty Dirt Band: Uncle Charlie & His Dog Teddy
Feb 1970 Kenny Rogers & The First Edition: Something's Burning
Mar 1970 Linda Ronstadt: Silk Purse
April 1970 Great Speckled Bird: Great Speckled Bird
April 1970 The Flying Burrito Brothers: Burrito Deluxe
May 1970 Poco: Poco
Jun 1970 Grateful Dead: Workingman's Dead
July 1970 Michael Nesmith: Magnetic South
July 1970 Creedence Clearwater Revival: Cosmo's Factory
Aug 1970 The Band: Stage Fright
Aug 1970 Neil Young: After the Gold Rush
Sep 1970 Ringo Starr: Beaucoups of Blues
Sep 1970 The Byrds: Untitled
Sep 1970 Rick Nelson: Rick Sings Nelson
Oct 1970 Bob Dylan: New Morning
Nov 1970 Michael Nesmith: Loose Salute
Nov 1970 Elvis Presley: Back in Memphis
Nov 1970 Grateful Dead: American Beauty
Dec 1970 Ry Cooder: Ry Cooder
Dec 1970 Creedence Clearwater Revival: Pendulum

1971
1971 Linda Ronstadt: Linda Ronstadt
1971 Mason Proffit: Movin' Toward Happiness
1971 Mason Proffit: Last Night I Had the Strangest Dream
1971 Brewer & Shipley: Shake Off The Demon
Jan 1971 Elvis Presley: Elvis Country (I'm 10,000 Years Old)
Jan 1971 Poco: Deliverin'
Mar 1971 New Riders of the Purple Sage: New Riders of the Purple Sage
Mar 1971: Black Oak Arkansas: Black Oak Arkansas
Mar 1971 Delaney & Bonnie: Motel Shot
April 1971 Commander Cody and His Lost Planet Airmen: Lost in the Ozone
May 1971 Michael Nesmith: Nevada Fighter
May 1971 Johnny Cash Man in Black
June 1971 The Byrds: Byrdmaniax
June 1971 The Flying Burrito Brothers: The Flying Burrito Brothers
Aug 1971 Gene Clark: White Light
Sep 1971 Poco: From the Inside
Sep 1971 John Hartford: Aereo-Plain
Nov 1971 Rick Nelson Rudy the Fifth
Dec 1971 The Byrds: Farther Along

1972
1972 Kenny Rogers & The First Edition The Ballad of Calico
1972 Mason Proffit: Rockfish Crossing
1972 The Nitty Gritty Dirt Band: Will The Circle Be Unbroken?
1972 Brewer & Shipley Rural Space
Jan 1972 Steve Young: Seven Bridges Road
Feb 1972 Neil Young: Harvest
Feb 1972 Ry Cooder Into the Purple Valley
Feb 1972 Michael Nesmith: Tantamount to Treason Vol. 1
Mar 1972 Everly Brothers: Stories We Could Tell
Mar 1972 Rick Nelson: Garden Party
Mar 1972 Pure Prairie League: Pure Prairie League
Mar 1972 New Riders of the Purple Sage: Powerglide
Apr 1972 Manassas: Manassas
Apr 1972 Creedence Clearwater Revival: Mardi Gras
May 1972 Barefoot Jerry:  Barefoot Jerry
June 1972 Eagles: Eagles
Aug 1972 Michael Nesmith: And the Hits Just Keep on Comin'
Aug 1972 Pure Prairie League: Bustin' Out
Oct 1972 Gene Clark: Roadmaster (recorded 1970-72)
Nov 1972 Poco: A Good Feelin’ To Know
Nov 1972 Ry Cooder Boomer's Story
Dec 1972 Ian Matthews: Journeys from Gospel Oak

1973
1973 Linda Hargrove: Music Is Your Mistress
1973 Mason Proffit: Bare Back Rider
1973 John Kay: My Sportin' Life
1973 Lilyリリィ: Dulcimer- Nothing By Mouth = ダルシマ ＜なにも伝わないで＞
Jan 1973 Gram Parsons: GP
Jan 1973 Doug Sahm Doug Sahm and Band
Mar 1973 The Byrds: Byrds
Mar 1973 John Fogerty The Blue Ridge Rangers
Apr 1973 Ozark Mountain Daredevils: Ozark Mountain Daredevils
Apr 1973 Eagles: Desperado
Apr 1973 The Marshall Tucker Band: The Marshall Tucker Band
Sep 1973 Poco: Crazy Eyes
Sep 1973 Leon Russell: Hank Wilson's Back Vol. I
Oct 1973 Masa Takagi 高木麻早: Masa Takagi 高木麻早  
Oct 1973 Michael Nesmith: Pretty Much Your Standard Ranch Stash
Oct 1973 Neil Young: Time Fades Away
Nov 1973 Alvin Lee & Mylon LeFevre: On the Road to Freedom
Nov 1973 Ian Matthews: Valley Hi
Nov 1973 Gene Parsons: Kindling
Dec 1973 New Riders of the Purple Sage: The Adventures of Panama Red

1974
1974 Mason Proffit: Come And Gone
1974 Souther–Hillman–Furay Band: The Souther–Hillman–Furay Band
1974 Brewer & Shipley ST11261
Jan 1974 Gram Parsons: Grievous Angel
Jan 1974 Rick Nelson: Windfall
Jan 1974 Linda Ronstadt: Different Drum
Mar 1974 Eagles: On the Border
Apr 1974 Poco: Seven
May 1974 Masa Takagi 高木麻早: Masa 麻早
May 1974 The Marshall Tucker Band: A New Life
May 1974 Ry Cooder Paradise and Lunch
Jul 1974 The Flying Burrito Brothers: Close Up the Honky Tonks
July 1974 Neil Young: On the Beach
Sep 1974 Gene Clark: No Other
Sep 1974 Richard Betts: Highway Call
Sep 1974 Masa Takagi 高木麻早: Take A Ten
Oct 1974 Ozark Mountain Daredevils: It'll Shine When It Shines
Nov 1974 Linda Ronstadt: Heart Like a Wheel
Nov 1974 Poco: Cantamos

1975
1975 Souther-Hillman-Furay Band: Trouble in Paradise
1975 The Ozark Mountain Daredevils: The Car Over the Lake Album
1975 Amazing Rhythm Aces: Stacked Deck
1975 Brinsley Schwarz: Nervous on the Road/The New Favourites of Brinsley Schwarz
1975 Spanky And Our Gang: Change
Jan 1975 Elvis Presley Promised Land
Mar 1975 The Outlaws:  The Outlaws
Mar 1975 Pure Prairie League: Two Lane Highway
Jun 1975 Neil Young: Tonight's the Night (recorded 1973)
Jun 1975 Bob Dylan & The Band: The Basement Tapes (recorded June-Sep 1967)
Jul 1975 Poco: Head over Heels
Jul 1975 Masa Takagi 高木麻早: Door to the Heart こころの扉
Sep 1975 Poco: The Very Best of Poco
Sep 1975 John Fogerty: John Fogerty
Oct 1975 The Flying Burrito Brothers: Flying Again
Oct 1975 Emmylou Harris: Pieces of the Sky
Nov 1975 Charlie Daniels: Fire on the Mountain

1976
1976 The Outlaws: Lady in Waiting
1976 The Ozark Mountain Daredevils:  Men From Earth
1976 Firefall: Firefall
1976 Amazing Rhythm Aces: Too Stuffed to Jump
1976 American Flyer: American Flyer
1976 New Riders of the Purple Sage: The Best of New Riders of the Purple Sage
1976 Brewer & Shipley: Welcome To Riddle Bridge
1976 Nitty Gritty Dirt Band: Dirt, Silver and Gold
Jan 1976 Pure Prairie League: If the Shoe Fits
Feb 1976 Eagles: Their Greatest Hits (1971–1975)
Mar 1976 The Charlie Daniels Band: Saddle Tramp
Jun 1976 The Flying Burrito Brothers: Airborne
Oct 1976 Poco: Rose of Cimarron
Nov 1976 The Charlie Daniels Band: High Lonesome
Nov 1976 Pure Prairie League:  Dance
Nov 1976 Poco: Live

1977
1977 Daniel Amos Shotgun Angel
1977 Firefall:  Luna Sea
1977 The Outlaws:  Hurry Sundown
1977 The Ozark Mountain Daredevils:  Don't Look Down
1977 Townes Van Zandt: Live at the Old Quarter, Houston, Texas
1977 Rick Nelson: Intakes
Jan 1977 Jimmy Buffett: Changes in Latitudes, Changes in Attitudes
Jan 1977 Emmylou Harris:  Luxury Liner
Jan 1977 Gene Clark: Two Sides to Every Story (recorded 1976)
Mar 1977 Michael Nesmith: From A Radio Engine To The Photon Wing
May 1977 Poco:  Indian Summer
Aug 1977 Pure Prairie League: Live ! Takin' The Stage
Dec 1977 Jackson Browne:  Running on Empty

1978
1978 Firefall:  Elan
1978 Juice Newton:  Well Kept Secret
1978 The Ozark Mountain Daredevils:  It's Alive!
1978 Toby Beau:  Toby Beau
1978 Joe Ely: Honky Tonk Masquerade
Oct 1978 Neil Young: Comes a Time

1979
1979 Hoyt Axton: A Rusty Old Halo
1979 Clover: Chronicle
Apr 1979 Charlie Daniels Band: Million Mile Reflections

1980
1980 Amazing Rhythm Aces: How The Hell Do You Spell Rythum?
1980 Dirt Band: Make a Little Magic
1980 Firefall: Undertow
1980 Firefall: Clouds Across The Sun
1980 Hoyt Axton: Where Did the Money Go?
1980 The Outlaws: Ghost Riders
1980 The Ozark Mountain Daredevils: Ozark Mountain Daredevils
1980 Joe Ely: Live Shots
1980 Rita Coolidge: Greatest Hits
Jul 1980 The Charlie Daniels Band: Full Moon

1981
Jul 1981 Poco: Blue and Gray
Oct 1981 Elvis Costello & the Attractions: Almost Blue

1982
1982 Jason & The Scorchers: Reckless Country Soul
1982 Juice Newton: Quiet Lies
Feb 1982 Poco: Cowboys & Englishmen
Sep 1982 Poco: Ghost Town

1983
Jun 1983 The Charlie Daniels Band: A Decade of Hits (Charlie Daniels album)

1985
1985 Lone Justice: Lone Justice
1985 Jimmy Buffett: Songs You Know by Heart: Jimmy Buffett's Greatest Hit(s)
Aug 1985 Nick Lowe & His Cowboy Outfit: The Rose of England

1986
1986 Albert Lee: Country Guitar Man
1986 The Jayhawks: The Jayhawks
Mar 1986 Steve Earle: Guitar Town

1987
1987 The Beau Brummels: The Best of the Beau Brummels: Golden Archive Series
Mar 1987 Blue Rodeo: Outskirts

1988
1988 Various Artists: The Best of Shiloh & More, Vol. 1
1988 The Flying Burrito Brothers: Farther Along: The Best of the Flying Burrito Brothers
Oct 1988 Steve Earle: Copperhead Road

1989
1989 Nick Lowe: Basher: The Best of Nick Lowe

1990
1990 Doug Sahm & the Sir Douglas Quintet: The Best of Doug Sahm & the Sir Douglas Quintet 1968-1975
1990 The Flatlanders: More a Legend Than a Band
1980 Commander Cody and His Lost Planet Airmen: Too Much Fun: Best of Commander Cody
July 1990 Steve Earle: The Hard Way
Oct 1990 Poco: The Forgotten Trail (1969–74)
Nov 1990 Blue Rodeo: Casino

1991
1991 The Dillards: There Is a Time (1963-70)
1991 Southern Pacific: Greatest Hits
1991 Brinsley Schwarz: Surrender to the Rhythm
Jan 1991 Desert Rose Band: A Dozen Roses: Greatest Hits

1992
1991 Firefall: Greatest Hits
October 1992 Neil Young:  Harvest Moon
September 1992 The Jayhawks: Hollywood Town Hall
October 1992 Michael Nesmith Tropical Campfires

1993
1993 Rick Nelson: Stay Young
1993 Michael Nesmith: Complete First National Band Recordings

1994
Jul 1994 Eagles: The Very Best of the Eagles (1994)
Nov 1994 Nick Lowe: The Impossible Bird

1995
1995 The Marshall Tucker Band: The Best of the Marshall Tucker Band: The Capricorn Years
1995 Various Artists: Hillbilly Fever, Vol. 5: Legends of Country Rock
1995 Pure Prairie League: The Best of Pure Prairie League
Feb 1995 Steve Earle: Train a Comin'

1996
1996 Various Artists: Heroes of Country Music, Vol. 5: Legends of Country Rock
Jul 1996 Steve Earle: Ain't Ever Satisfied: The Steve Earle Collection

1997
1997 Gary Stewart: The Essential Gary Stewart
1997 Dan Hicks & His Hot Licks: Return to Hicksville: The Best of Dan Hicks & His Hot Licks—The Blue Thumb Years
Jun 1997 Ozark Mountain Daredevils:  13
Jul 1997 Neko Case and Her Boyfriends: The Virginian

1998
1998 Gene Clark: Flying High
1998 Rick Nelson: Bright Lights & Country Music/Country Fever
1998 The Long Ryders: Anthology
1998 Alabama: For the Record
1998 Townes Van Zandt: Anthology: 1968-1979 (Charly)
Nov 1998 Poco: The Ultimate Collection

1999
1999 Michael Nesmith Live at the Britt Festival

2000s
Feb 2000 The Byrds: Live at the Fillmore – February 1969
Sep 2002 Beck: Sea Change
Nov 2004 Neko Case: The Tigers Have Spoken
May 2005 Ryan Adams & The Cardinals : Cold Roses
Jun 2005 Joel Plaskett: La De Da
Dec 2005 Pure Prairie League: All in Good Time
Mar 2006 Neko Case: Fox Confessor Brings the Flood
Mar 2006 The Little Willies: The Little Willies
May 2006 David Allan Coe & Cowboys from Hell: Rebel Meets Rebel
Jun 2007 Bon Jovi: Lost Highway
Oct 2007 Robert Plant and Alison Krauss: Raising Sand
Apr 2008 Mudcrutch: Mudcrutch
Jun 2008 The Road Hammers: Blood Sweat & Steel
Jul 2008 The Byrds: Live at Royal Albert Hall 1971
Jul 2008 John Mellencamp: Life, Death, Love and Freedom
Jun 2009 Deer Tick: Born on Flag Day
Aug 2009 John Fogerty: The Blue Ridge Rangers Rides Again
Oct 2009 Brantley Gilbert: A Modern Day Prodigal Son

2010s
Sep 2010 Robert Plant: Band of Joy
Sep 2011 Blitzen Trapper: American Goldwing
Jan 2012 The Little Willies: For the Good Times
Mar 2012 Brantley Gilbert: Halfway to Heaven
May 2012 Dallas Smith: Jumped Right In
June 2013 Rocky and the Natives: Let's Hear It For the Old Guys
Oct 2013 Thomas Rhett: It Goes Like This
May 2014 Brantley Gilbert: Just As I Am
Jun 2014 The Road Hammers: Wheels
Oct 2014 Florida Georgia Line: Anything Goes
Nov 2014 Dallas Smith: Lifted
May 2015 Cory Marks: This Man
Jan 2017 Brantley Gilbert: The Devil Don't Sleep
Dec 2017 Lit: These Are the Days
Nov 2019 Jason Aldean: 9

2020s
Aug 2020 Cory Marks: Who I Am
Sep 2020 Hardy: A Rock

References

 
Country Rock